Edmund James Stephen Sonuga-Barke,  (born 1962) is a developmental psychologist and academic. He has held professorships at King's College London (since 2017) and the University of Southampton (1997–2017).

Early life and education
Edmund James Stephen Barke was born in Derby in 1962; he later adopted a double-barrelled surname for his academic work, combining his family name with that of his wife, Funke Sonuga, whom he married in 1987. They have two children. He graduated with a Bachelor of Science degree in psychology from the University College of North Wales, Bangor, in 1984, and four years later the University of Exeter awarded him a doctorate for his thesis "Studies in the development of economic behaviour".

Career
After a year as a research psychologist at the University of London, Sonuga-Barke was appointed to a lectureship at the Institute of Psychiatry in 1988. The next year, he moved to the University of Southampton where he was lecturer (1989–95), reader (1995–97) and professor (from 1997) of developmental psychopathology. He was head of Southampton's Department of Psychology from 1997 to 2002. In 2017, Sonuga-Barke joined King's College London as Professor of Developmental Psychology, Psychiatry and Neuroscience. In 2016, he was elected a Fellow of the Academy of Medical Sciences and in 2018 he was elected a Fellow of the British Academy, the United Kingdom's national academy for the humanities and social sciences. He is the editor-in-chief of the Journal of Child Psychology & Psychiatry.

According to the British Academy's profile, his research focuses on "The developmental psychopathology and neuroscience of child and adolescent mental health and disorder". In the field of ADHD he is known for introducing new concepts and theories such as the delay aversion hypothesis, the dual pathway model  and the default mode interference hypothesis.

References 

Living people
Developmental psychologists
Alumni of Bangor University
Alumni of the University of Exeter
Academics of the University of London
Academics of the University of Southampton
Fellows of the Academy of Medical Sciences (United Kingdom)
Fellows of the British Academy
1962 births